Mio Dam is a hydro-electric dam located on the Au Sable River in Michigan capable of generating 4.96 MW of electric power.  It was the 4th of 6 dams built by Consumers Power between 1906 and 1924 along the Au Sable River and is the furthest upstream of the six.  The dam was completed in 1916.  The Mio Hydroelectric Plant consists of an embankment on each side connected by a spillway. Located North of the spillway is the powerhouse and outdoor substation. Public access to Mio Pond is provided via a boat ramp maintained by Consumers Energy, and portage facilities are also provided allowing canoes and kayaks access to bypass the dam. Portage the dam on the right using the cement stairs then carry down a gravel road with a canoe slide on the down river side of the dam.  The Mio Dam powerhouse continues to operate with the same turbines and generators that were installed over a century ago.

Recognition and Significance
NATIONAL WILD AND SCENIC RIVER: In 1984 the Federal government designated the 23-mile stretch of river below the dam as a part of the National Wild and Scenic River System.  This special stretch between the Mio Dam and Alcona Dam provides habitat for bald eagles and the endangered Kirtland’s warbler and numerous recreational opportunities like hiking, camping, fishing, canoeing, picnicking and bird watching.

MICHIGAN HISTORIC SITE: In 2005 the Mio Dam was named as a Michigan Historic Site because it was the first hydro to route excess river flow through conduits built into the foundation of the powerhouse (known as under-sluce) rather than the typical costly above-ground gated spillway.  Nevertheless, in 1988 the dam was modified to meet then-current federal dam safety standards requiring an additional above-ground concrete spillway be added. Now, if the pond level rises above the capacity of the conduit/under-sluice spillway, the water overflows over the newer static spillway.

HYDRO HALL OF FAME: In June 2017, the Mio Dam's historically unique significance was celebrated when it was inducted into the Hydro Hall of Fame by HydroVision International recognizing the ingenuity of its initial design (conduit spillways under the powerhouse foundation) and the over 100 years of value the dam has provided. The unique under-slice design reduced tailwater erosion during spill operation, reduced construction expense, and eliminated ice build-up on tainter gates during winter.  This under-sluce design was also incorporated into other Consumers Power Company hydro dams including the next dam downriver from Mio, the Alcona Dam built in 1924.

AU SABLE CANOE MARATHON: The Mio dam is one of 6 dams portaged by canoe race teams during the 120-mile long overnight Au Sable River Canoe Marathon that happens each summer requiring two years to build.

Technical Information 
According to page 113 of the book "The Lower Peninsula of Michigan: An Inventory of Historic Engineering and Industrial Sites" by Charles K Hyde the Mio dam is an earth embankment dam utilizing a reinforced concrete core wall creating a head of 29 feet of water. The original installation is still in operation today including the two Allis-Chalmers vertical turbines and two Allis-Chalmers generators each producing 2,500 KW, 2,500-volts, and operating at 80 R.P.M.  The powerhouse is a rectangular flat-roofed brick building measuring 30 ft wide by 75 ft long.  The isolated location for the construction of the dam was miles from the closest rail lines in Luzerne thereby complicating the transportation of supplies including concrete, steel, and some machinery weighing over 30 tons which would need to ship by horse-drawn wagons those last miles.  Furthermore, the narrow space available in the channel required the use of a then-innovative "conduit spillway" design patented by William W. Tefft who became the Chiel Engineer for Consumers Power Company.  This spillway utilized two 60-inch steel tubes to direct the water under the powerhouse.  In addition, the dam has one small concrete spillway with a single tainter gate.

Consumers Energy, who owns and operates the Mio Dam, installed a cool water upwelling system in 2009 to reduce river water temperatures on hot days as negotiated with a comprehensive settlement agreement with multiple resource agencies to improve habitat for fish and other aquatic life downstream.  Studies showed that some fish species, like Trout, became stressed as water temperatures increased.  The current system in place at Mio and other Consumers Energy Dams uses an underwater air bubbler to lift/mix colder lower-lying water to the intake pipes for the turbines.  Consumers Energy's operating license requires the water to be 68 degrees.  When water temperatures rise, the compressors are activated typically for 6 hours a day to mimic evening cooling cycles but has been run as long as 24-hours a day at Mio.

River Flow and Safety
Since the mid-1960s, the Mio Dam has operated as a run-of-the-river hydroelectricity dam. The river flow leaving the Mio hydro-electric plant and moving downstream matches the flow entering the Mio pond upstream. Since then, automatic gate operators have been added to the generators for run-of-river controls that automatically adjust the unit governors to maintain the steady 29 feet head elevation, and therefore maintain run-of-river flow through the powerhouse.  Consumers Energy, formerly named Consumers Power Company, regularly monitors and review water flows and water temperatures to maintain safe operation of the hydro dams doing a controlled release of excess water when necessary. Additionally, the United States Geological Survey (USGS) maintains 6 real-time water-level gages on the Au Sable River as a part of its National Streamflow Information Program.  This information is fed to the National Weather Service's Advanced Hydrologic Prediction Service typically allowing the monitoring and reporting of water levels, flow speed, temperature, and water quality (oxygen) along the river.  One of those gauges (ID: MIOM4) is located at the Mio Dam.

"Condition C" is a term used to indicate high flow and a non-emergency, "Condition B" indicates a failure may eventually occur, whereas "Condition A" is where there is dam failure or imminent failure of the dam.  Consumers Energy says Condition C is not a regular event on Au Sable River hydro dams. Local emergency management teams regularly train and have coordinated event plans should there ever be a "Condition A" event.  In July 2020, the Emergency Management Coordinator for both Oscoda and Alcona counties was reported in the Alpena News newspaper as saying that failure of the Mio Dam could be the worst possible danger to the public because it is expected that a failure of the Mio Dam would cause the subsequent five other dams downriver to fail as well.

References

External links
 Hydro Review article regarding Mio Dam
 Consumers Energy video regarding the history of the Mio Dam
 USGS/NOAA Hydrologic Measurements at Mio Dam (downriver side of dam).

Dams in Michigan
Hydroelectric power plants in Michigan
Buildings and structures in Oscoda County, Michigan
Dams completed in 1916
Energy infrastructure completed in 1916
Consumers Energy dams
1916 establishments in Michigan